Steeve Theophile (born 9 September 1980 in Paris, France) is a French footballer who played 3 matches in Ligue 1 for club FC Istres in the 2004-2005 season and played 55 matches and scored 9 goals in Ligue 2 for clubs FC Gueugnon and US Créteil-Lusitanos during 2002-2004 period .

References

1980 births
Living people
French footballers
Footballers from Paris
FC Istres players
FC Gueugnon players
US Créteil-Lusitanos players

Association football forwards